Anobrium minimum is a species of beetle in the family Cerambycidae. It was described by Martins, Galileo and de Oliveira in 2009. It is known from Brazil.

References

Pteropliini
Beetles described in 2009